Lynn County Courthouse may refer to:

 Lyon County Courthouse (Iowa), Rock Rapids, Iowa
 Lyon County Courthouse (Kansas), Emporia, Kansas
 Kiel and Morgan Hotel, Lynd, Minnesota, formerly the Lyon County Courthouse
 Lyon County Courthouse (Nevada), Yerington, Nevada